Heart North and Mid Wales  is a regional radio station owned by Communicorp UK and operated by Global Radio as part of the Heart network. It broadcasts to North and Mid Wales from studios in Gwersyllt, near Wrexham.

Heart North and Mid Wales launched at 6am on Tuesday 6 May 2014, replacing the former Heart North West and Wales station. The rebrand coincided with the relaunch of Heart South Wales - meaning a fully separate North and Mid Wales licence, effectively restoring a regional service to South and West Wales.

History
In December 2008, GMG Media was awarded an FM licence to launch a new Real Radio station serving North and Mid Wales. Initially, the company pledged to produce separate local programming and news bulletins for the region in addition to off-peak pan-Wales output. Following an agreed format change request, the existing service covering south and west Wales was instead expanded to form a national service with no opt-outs. Real Radio Wales began broadcasting to the area at 8am on Tuesday 4 January 2011.

On 6 February 2014, Global Radio reached an agreement to sell the Northern licence for Real Radio Wales and seven other stations across the UK to Communicorp. The adjoining South and West Wales licence remains under Global's ownership. Under OFCOM rules, the sale required the then all-Wales station to be split into two with separate Heart stations launched under separate owners.

The new Heart North and Mid Wales station launched at 6am on Tuesday 6 May 2014. The move coincided with the rebrand and relaunch of Heart's North West and Wales and Cymru stations as part of the Capital network. The Heart and Capital stations share facilities at Global's studios in Gwersyllt, near Wrexham.

In February 2019, following OFCOM's decision to relax local content obligations from commercial radio, Global announced it would replace Heart North and Mid Wales' local breakfast and weekend shows with networked programming from London.

As of 3 June 2019, the station's local output consists of a three-hour Drivetime show on weekdays, alongside local news bulletins, traffic updates and advertising.

Analogue (FM)

Digital (DAB)

On air date March 2013

Programming
All networked programming originates from Global's London headquarters, including Heart Breakfast with Jamie Theakston and Amanda Holden.

Regional programming is produced and broadcast from the Wrexham studios from 4-7pm on weekdays, presented by Oli Kemp and Lois Cernyw.

News
Global's Cardiff Bay and Wrexham newsrooms broadcast hourly regional news bulletins from 6am-7pm on weekdays and 6am-12pm at weekends with headlines on the half hour during weekday breakfast and drivetime shows.

National news updates air hourly from Global's London headquarters at all other times.

References

External links

Communicorp
North Wales
Radio stations established in 2011
Heart North Wales